Stratford Butterfly Farm is a visitor attraction in Stratford-upon-Avon, Warwickshire, England.  A leafy tropical environment is simulated inside large greenhouses.  There are numerous free flying butterflies, a few free flying birds, a pool containing fish, and running water.  There are also insects and spiders living in glass displays.

Design
Stratford Butterfly Farm consists of three main areas:

Caterpillar Room which houses caterpillars, pupae, eggs and specialist plants for butterfly breeding. This is the large walk through glasshouse.

Insect City houses the more exotic insects, such as beetles, praying mantis, stick insects and giant millipedes.
The insects are all behind glass and above your head is a glass confinement of leaf cutter ants. A section in insect city is called 'mini beast' and has snails and crabs.

Arachnoland houses over 15 species of spider from black widows to tarantulas. They also have the world's largest spider species, the Goliath birdeater. Arachnoland also includes a collection of scorpions including Imperial Scorpions that glow in the dark. Once again these are all behind glass.

History
Stratford Butterfly Farm was opened by David Bellamy in 1985 and it celebrated its 25th anniversary on 24 July 2010.

On 3 June 2002, part of a glass butterfly nursery that was used for breeding rare and exotic butterflies was destroyed in a fire. A firework from a jubilee firework display is thought to have landed in an empty plastic flower pot next to the greenhouse and started the fire. About 90 exotic butterflies were in the nursery at the time and the majority were saved; however, special exotic plants that were used for butterfly breeding were destroyed by the fire.

References

External links 

 Stratford Butterfly Farm's website

Buildings and structures in Stratford-upon-Avon
Butterfly houses
Tourist attractions in Warwickshire
Insectariums